Obadiah ben Abraham of Bertinoro (1445 –  1515), commonly known as "The Bartenura", was a 15th-century Italian rabbi best known for his popular commentary on the Mishnah. In his later years, he rejuvenated the Jewish community of Jerusalem and became recognised as the spiritual leader of the Jews of his generation.

Arrival in the Land of Israel
Obadiah was a pupil of Joseph Colon Trabotto (Maharik), and became rabbi in Bertinoro, a town in the modern province of Forlì-Cesena, whence he derived his by-name, and in Castello.

"The desire to visit the Holy Land led him to Jerusalem; and he arrived there on March 25, 1488, having commenced his journey Oct[ober] 29, 1486. His advent in Israel marked a new epoch for the Jewish community there. ... The administration of Jewish communal affairs in Jerusalem had fallen into the hands of iniquitous officials. ... The poor were pitilessly taxed for the Mohammedan government; the rich were similarly treated and driven from the city by exorbitant demands upon them, so that the Jewish community was on the brink of ruin."

In a letter written to his brother from Jerusalem on 24 August 1489, Obadiah mentions that Jews flock to Jerusalem from Egypt, Damascus, Aleppo and other places in order to worship God. During that same year he says that he also met Jews from Aden. He says of himself that he was living in the home of the nagid, and that he gives regular sermons in a synagogue twice a month to the Jewish community, in the Hebrew tongue, and that he was exempt from paying the customary tax assessed to all other Jewish citizens. Later that year, on 17 December 1489, he writes that he had moved to Hebron where he found the atmosphere much more conducive, and a small Jewish community numbering some twenty households who were of a better temperament than those in Jerusalem, and where they lived along one alleyway.

Influence in Israel
"Bertinoro's personality, eloquence, and great reputation as a scholar led to his being accepted as the spiritual head of the community immediately upon his arrival. His first care was to raise the intellectual plane of the community, and for this purpose he interested the younger generation in the study of the Talmud and rabbinic literature, and he delivered sermons every other Sabbath in Hebrew."

"His connections in Italy supplied him with money for the support of the poor, which also added not a little to his influence. He succeeded in securing the abolition of the annual tax of 400 ducats, which had afforded such opportunity for oppression and injustice; in lieu a simple poll-tax payable direct to the government was instituted."

"When, on the expulsion of the Jews from Spain in 1492, many of the exiles settled in Jerusalem, Bertinoro became their intellectual leader. These Spanish Jews, far superior in intelligence, culture, and learning to the Musta'arabi Jews of Israel, presented Bertinoro with a site for a yeshibah in Jerusalem, which he founded, more than a thousand years after the extinction of the last academy in Israel. Considerable support for the maintenance of the yeshibah was given by the Jews of Egypt and Turkey at Bertinoro's written solicitation. , naggid or prince of Egypt, was especially helpful."

"In the decade during which Bertinoro thus controlled the best interests of the Jewish community at Jerusalem, a radical change for the better developed. Shortly after his arrival he had actually been compelled upon one occasion to dig a grave because the community had provided no one to perform that labor; a few years later there had come into existence such benevolent institutions as hospitals, charitable relief societies, and similar associations, all under excellent management. His fame and reputation spread to all parts of the Orient, and he came to be looked upon as a rabbinical authority of highest eminence; even the Mohammedan population frequently called upon him to decide judicial cases. ... He harshly reproved the rabbis for exacting fees for services at weddings and divorces, a custom then general in Germany. ... He believed it their duty to perform religious ceremonies without monetary remuneration."

Literary activity

Theology
"Bertinoro is usually known as the best commentator of the Mishnah; the importance of his commentary is illustrated by the fact that since its appearance (Venice, 1549) hardly an edition of the Mishnah has been printed without it." The commentary is based mainly on Rashi and Maimonides (the "Rambam").

"Bertinoro is also the author of a supercommentary upon Rashi's Pentateuch commentary (published under the title "Amar Naki" [Pure Wool]", Pisa, 1810; reprinted in the collective work "Rabbotenu Ba'ale ha-Tosafot," Warsaw, 1889)." Amar naki or "amar neqe" is a quote from Dan .

"Some liturgical productions by Bertinoro exist in manuscript in the Bodleian Library, Oxford (Nos. 1061; 2266, 6; in the first the name of his father is mentioned)."

Travel
"He also wrote descriptions of his travels; and his letters to his relations in Italy, although intended only as private communications, are of great historical value. Most interesting in these letters (first published by S. Sachs in the "Jahrbuch für Geschichte der Juden," 1863, iii. 195-224) is the fund of information concerning the social and intellectual conditions of the Jews in Greece, Egypt, and Israel. He shows himself therein not only a close observer, but a conscientious and unprejudiced chronicler. For example, he studied attentively the conditions of the Karaites in Alexandria, and did not hesitate to praise them for the possession of the very virtues which the Rabbanites denied to them, such as generosity and liberality (l.c. p. 208; the text is to be emended according to the manuscript mentioned in Steinschneider, "Hebr. Bibl." vi. 131). His description of the Samaritans in Egypt (l.c. pp. 206–208) is one of the most valuable and reliable of medieval times."

References

Attribution
This article is based to a large degree on text from The Jewish Encyclopedia (1901–1906), a publication now in the public domain:  Ginzberg, Louis. "Bertinoro, Obadiah (Yareh) b. Abraham (called also Bartinoro)". Singer, Isidore; et al., eds.. New York: Funk & Wagnalls.

Further reading

1440s births
1510s deaths
15th-century Italian rabbis
Burials at the Jewish cemetery on the Mount of Olives
Commentaries on the Mishnah
People from Bertinoro
Rabbis in Hebron
15th-century rabbis in Jerusalem
16th-century rabbis in Jerusalem
Year of birth uncertain
Year of death uncertain